Heyi Subdistrict is a subdistricts located on the southeast of Fengtai District, Beijing, China. It shares border with Nanyuan Township to the north, Jiugong Township to the east, Nanyuan Subdistrict and Township to the south and west. It has a total of 40,108 residents as of 2020.

History 
Prioir to the 1990s, the region around Heyi was part of Daxing District and only developed for agricultural purposes. In 1995, a residential microdistrict was constructed in order to house residents who moved out of Chongwen and Xuanwu Districts, as the two districts were undergoing renovation at the time. The subdistrict was formally created On December 31, 1998. In 2010, Jiujingzhuang Community from Dahongmen Subdistrict was incorporated into Heyi as well.

Administrative Division 
In 2021, Heyi Subdistrict comprises 12 subdivisions, with 11 of them being communities and 1 being a village:

See also 

 List of township-level divisions of Beijing

References 

Fengtai District
Subdistricts of Beijing